William Alfred Andrew Newton (born 1896; date of death unknown) was an English footballer who played at left-half for Newton Heath, Manchester City, Port Vale, and numerous other non-League clubs.

Career
Newton played for Romiley St. Chad's, Park Albion, Marple Amateurs and Newton Heath. He played two league games for Manchester City in 1919. He guested for Burnley and then Port Vale in April 1919, before joining the latter club permanently. In October 1919, Port Vale were re-elected from the Central League to the Football League. Newton and Tom Holford battled for the position on the left of midfield, but by February 1920, Holford had established himself as the club's preferred left-half. Newton featured in 14 Second Division games in 1919–20. He later played for Southend United and Accrington Stanley, before playing two Manchester League games for Hyde United in November 1922. He later played for Hurst, Ashton National, Romiley, Marple, and Congleton Town.

Career statistics
Source:

References

Footballers from Stockport
English footballers
Association football midfielders
Manchester United F.C. players
Hyde United F.C. players
Manchester City F.C. players
Burnley F.C. wartime guest players
Port Vale F.C. wartime guest players
Port Vale F.C. players
Southend United F.C. players
Accrington Stanley F.C. (1891) players
Ashton United F.C. players
Ashton National F.C. players
Congleton Town F.C. players
English Football League players
Year of death missing
1896 births